Asser may refer to:

 Asser, a Welsh monk who wrote a life of Alfred the Great
 Asser (name)
 Turnbull & Asser, clothing company
 T.M.C. Asser Instituut, legal research institute